This is a list of Sega Genesis/Mega Drive video games that have sold or shipped at least one million copies, sorted in order of copies sold. The best-selling title is Sonic the Hedgehog, first released in North America on June 23, 1991. Due to being bundled with the console, it sold 15 million copies. The second best-selling game is its sequel, 1992's Sonic the Hedgehog 2, with 6 million copies sold.

List

See also
List of best-selling video games
List of best-selling video game franchises
Lists of best-selling video games by platform
List of best-selling Nintendo Entertainment System video games
List of best-selling Super Nintendo Entertainment System video games
List of best-selling Game Boy video games
List of fastest-selling products
List of video games by player count
List of video games considered the best

References

 
Sega Genesis